Streaky Bay Airport  is an airport located  southeast of Streaky Bay, a town in the state of South Australia in Australia.

Facilities

See also
 List of airports in South Australia

References

External links
Official site

Airports in South Australia
Eyre Peninsula